"Goldmine" is a song recorded by Canadian country music artist George Fox. It was released in 1989 as the fourth single from his debut album, George Fox. It peaked at number 9 on the RPM Country Tracks chart in August 1989.

Chart performance

Year-end charts

References

1988 songs
1989 singles
George Fox songs
Warner Music Group singles